Sibirotherium is an extinct genus of docodont mammaliaform. It is known from only a single named species, Sibirotherium rossicum, known from jaw fragments and teeth found in the Early Cretaceous (Aptian) aged Ilek Formation in western Siberia, alongside Khorotherium also from Siberia, it is one of the youngest docodonts.

References 

Docodonts
Prehistoric cynodont genera